The 1939–40 Chicago Black Hawks season was the team's 14th season in the NHL, and they were coming off a disastrous 1938–39 season, in which the Hawks were the only team in the 7 team league to not qualify for the playoffs.  Paul Thompson, who finished the previous season as a player-coach with the Hawks, would retire from playing and become the full-time head coach of the team, and Chicago responded, as they improved by 20 points, finishing above .500 for the first time since 1935–36, and having their highest point total since 1934–35, as they would have a 23–19–6 record for 52 points, good for 4th place in the NHL standings.

Rookie Doug Bentley would lead the team with 12 goals, while Cully Dahlstrom would have team highs in assists (19) and points (30).  Joe Cooper led all defensemen with 11 points and had a team high 59 penalty minutes, while fellow blueliner Earl Seibert had another productive season, earning 10 points, despite missing some time due to injuries.

In goal, Mike Karakas would begin the season as the starter, however, after 17 games, he was loaned to the Montreal Canadiens for the remainder of the year after posting a 7–9–1 record and a 3.31 GAA.  Paul Goodman would then be named the Hawks starting goalie, and he would respond with a 16–10–5 record, and a team high 1.94 GAA.

Chicago would return to the playoffs after a 1-year absence, as they would face the 3rd place team, the Toronto Maple Leafs in a best of 3 series in the 1st round.  The Leafs would win the first game of the series by a score of 3–2 in OT at Maple Leaf Gardens, and Toronto would then eliminate Chicago by a 2–1 score in the 2nd game at Chicago Stadium to eliminate the Black Hawks.

Season standings

Record vs. opponents

Schedule and results

Regular season

Playoffs

Toronto Maple Leafs 2, Chicago Black Hawks 0

Player statistics

Regular season
Skaters

Goaltenders

Playoffs

Skaters

Goaltenders

References
SHRP Sports
The Internet Hockey Database
National Hockey League Guide & Record Book 2007

Notes

Chicago Blackhawks seasons
Chicago
Chicago